Crymostygius thingvallensis is a species of subterranean amphipod crustacean, endemic to the area around Þingvallavatn, a lake in southwestern Iceland. The species has no close relatives, and is placed in its own family, Crymostygidae. This distinctness has been confirmed by molecular phylogenetics.

References

Gammaridea
Fauna of Iceland
Monotypic crustacean genera
Endemic fauna of Iceland